Macomb  is a city in and the county seat of McDonough County, Illinois, United States. As of the 2020 census the population of the city was 15,051, down from 19,288 in 2010. Macomb is the home of Western Illinois University.

History

Origin

First settled in 1829 on a site tentatively named "Washington", the town was officially founded in 1830 as the county seat of McDonough County and given the name "Macomb" after Alexander Macomb, a general in the War of 1812. War veterans were given land grants in the Macomb area, which was part of the "Military Tract" set aside by Congress. In 1855 the Northern Cross Railroad, a predecessor to the Chicago, Burlington and Quincy Railroad, was constructed through Macomb, leading to a rise in the town's population. In 1899 the Western Illinois State Normal School, later Western Illinois University, was founded in Macomb. Representative Lawrence Sherman was instrumental in locating the school in Macomb. In 1903 the Macomb and Western Illinois Railway was built from Macomb to nearby Industry and Littleton by local financier Charles V. Chandler, though this railroad was abandoned in 1930. In 1918, construction on Illinois Route 3 was begun as a state financed highway from Cairo to Rock Island through Macomb; in the late 1920s U.S. Route 67 was extended along this route to Dubuque, Iowa.

Presidential visits
Macomb has been visited by several US Presidents over the years. Ulysses S. Grant, Andrew Johnson, Rutherford B. Hayes, William McKinley and Theodore Roosevelt have all made short addresses in Macomb. On two occasions, Abraham Lincoln and Barack Obama addressed large audiences prior to their election as president. Obama was actually stumping for the U.S. Senate at the time, meaning a president or presidential nominee has not visited Macomb in 109 years and counting.

St. Louis Rams summer camp
The WIU campus and its Hanson Field Stadium were home to the St. Louis Rams' football summer training camp from 1996 to 2004. In 2005, the Rams decided to move summer training to their own facilities in St. Louis, Missouri, ending the nine-year relationship.

Minor league baseball
Macomb was home to the Macomb Potters, who played as members of the Class D level Illinois-Missouri League in 1909 and 1910. The team also hosted two exhibition games against the Chicago Cubs. The Potters began play after local fans raised funds to start the team.

On Friday, June 18, 1909, the Macomb Potters hosted an exhibition game against the defending World Series Champion Chicago Cubs. The game was scheduled with the agreement that the Cubs would feature their regular lineup. The selected date allowed the Cubs to play in between the Cubs' series with the Brooklyn Superbas. The game was advertised as “the greatest day in the baseball history of McDonough County,” in a large advertisement placed in the June 17, 1909 Macomb Daily Journal. The teams took infield at 2:30 p.m., with the game starting at 3:00 p.m. In front of 2,964 fans, the Cubs beat the Potters 6–0. Admission was $1.00 per ticket. After the game, each team split the gate money minus expenses and each club received $971.50.

During the 1910 season, the Macomb Potters and the Chicago Cubs played a second exhibition game in Macomb. The 1910 game was won by the Cubs 5–0.

Geography 
Macomb is located at  (40.460501, -90.674048).  The East Fork Lamoine River flows past the northern part of the city.

U.S. Routes 67 and 136 pass through the city. They enter the city together from east on Jackson Street and split at the city center, US 67 turning north on Lafayette Street, and US 136 continuing west on Jackson Street. US 67 leads north  to Monmouth and south  to Rushville, while US 136 leads east  to Havana and west  to Keokuk, Iowa.

Demographics

As of the census of 2000, there were 18,558 people, 6,575 households, and 2,952 families residing in the city. The racial makeup of the city was 88.73% White, 5.93% African American, 3.06% Asian, 0.03% Pacific Islander, 0.69% from other races, and 1.40% from two or more races.  2.10% of the population were Hispanic or Latino of any race.

There were 6,575 households, out of which 19.1% had children under the age of 18 living with them, 34.9% were married couples living together, 7.4% had a female householder with no husband present, and 55.1% were non-families. 38.4% of all households were made up of individuals, and 12.4% had someone living alone who was 65 years of age or older. The average household size was 2.10 and the average family size was 2.77.

In the city, the population was spread out, with 12.6% under the age of 18, 42.9% from 18 to 24, 18.2% from 25 to 44, 14.0% from 45 to 64, and 12.4% who were 65 years of age or older. The median age was 23 years. For every 100 females, there were 94.3 males. For every 100 females age 18 and over, there were 93.8 males.

The median income for a household in the city was $25,994, and the median income for a family was $42,069. Males had a median income of $27,663 versus $21,780 for females. The per capita income for the city was $13,470. 29.1% of the population and 12.2% of families were below the poverty line. 22.8% of those under the age of 18 and 8.1% of those 65 and older were living below the poverty line.

Economy
Manufacturers:
 NTN-Bower Corporation
 Pella Windows
 Whalen Manufacturing

Education

 Western Illinois University
 Spoon River College, Macomb campus

Transportation
 Macomb (Amtrak station)
 Go West Transit
 Go West Transit Live Bus Tracking

Outdoor recreation
 Argyle Lake State Park ( west in Colchester Township)
 Harry Mussatto Golf Course
 Lakeview Nature Center
 Macomb Park District
 Spring Lake Park

Media

Newspapers
  The McDonough County Voice, daily newspaper
Western Courier

Filmings in Macomb
Cast in Gray (2005)
Wife Swap (2006)

Notable people 

 William Birenbaum (1923–2010), college administrator
 Michael Boatman, actor, attended Western Illinois University
 Phil Bradley, Major League Baseball player (1983–1990)
 Helen Tunnicliff Catterall (1870–1933), lawyer, writer
 Charles Clarke Chapman (1853–1944), businessman; first mayor of Fullerton, California; founder of Chapman University
 Bryan Cox, football player and coach, attended Western Illinois University
 Marcus Dunstan, screenwriter and director 
 Harry Gamage, University of Kentucky football head coach 1927-33
 Joe Garner, six-time New York Times bestselling author of non-fiction pop culture history
 Elizabeth Magie, inventor of The Landlord's Game, precursor to Monopoly
 John Mahoney (1940–2018), actor; alumnus of Western Illinois University 
 Ty Margenthaler, assistant coach with Wisconsin Badgers women's basketball team
 Kenneth G. McMillan, Illinois state senator and educator
 Red Miller, former head coach of NFL Denver Broncos and USFL Denver Gold
 Darrell Mudra (1929-2022), Canadian Football League and college football coach and member of the College Football Hall of Fame; head football coach of Western Illinois University from 1969 to 1973
 Michael Norman, author of the "Haunted" book series
 Donald C. Pogue, judge
 Todd Purdum, correspondent,  editor, Vanity Fair, New York Times
 Lou Saban (1921-2009), National Football League and college football player and coach; head football coach of Western Illinois University from 1957 to 1959 
 Al Sears, jazz tenor saxophonist and bandleader
 Stabbing Westward, rock band
 Damon G. Tunnicliff, Illinois Supreme Court justice; practiced law in Macomb
 Ruth May Tunnicliff (1876–1946), medical researcher
 Sarah Bacon Tunnicliff (1872–1957), clubwoman and reformer in Chicago
 Howard Turner, football player
 Rev. C.T. Vivian (1924-2020), minister and civil rights leader
 Henry Wells, author, professor and expert on Latin America politics

See also
 List of photographs of Abraham Lincoln

References

External links
 

 
Cities in Illinois
Cities in McDonough County, Illinois
Micropolitan areas of Illinois
County seats in Illinois
Populated places established in 1830
1830 establishments in Illinois